Wrocław Market Hall is a food hall in central Wrocław, Poland. Designed by Richard Plüddemann, it was built between 1906-08 as the Breslauer Markthalle Nr 1, when the city was part of German Empire. The Hall was renowned for its then-innovative application of reinforced concrete trusses, which was unique in Europe at the time. 

The complex is situated by Piaskowa Street (Sandstraße), at the junction of Plac Nankiera (Ritterplatz) and Św. Ducha Street (Heiligegeiststraße) close to Main Market Square and the historic Old Town. It was erected at the same time as another smaller hall with the same interior structure at Kolejowa Street. Both buildings were created in order to organize street trading in the city center. Once completed, all street markets were moved into the newly opened halls.  

The building was not severely damaged during World War II and continued to be used as originally intended shortly after, whereas the Kolejowa Hall was destroyed and its ruins demolished in 1973. The Wrocław Market Hall was refurbished between 1980-83, and again in the years 2018-2019; it remains one of the biggest produce markets in the city.

Gallery

References 
 Praca zbiorowa: Encyklopedia Wrocławia. Wrocław: Wydawnictwo Dolnośląskie 2006

External links
Portal of the Hall

Buildings and structures in Wrocław
Tourist attractions in Wrocław
Market
Art Nouveau retail buildings
Commercial buildings completed in 1908
Market halls
1908 establishments in Germany